Ádám Hajdú (born 16 January 1993 in Dunaújváros) is a Hungarian professional footballer who plays for Gyirmót.

Club statistics

Updated to games played as of 15 May 2022.

References
 MLSZ 
 HLSZ 
 

1993 births
Living people
Sportspeople from Dunaújváros
Hungarian footballers
Association football midfielders
MTK Budapest FC players
Budapest Honvéd FC players
Paksi FC players
Vasas SC players
Gyirmót FC Győr players
Nemzeti Bajnokság I players
Nemzeti Bajnokság II players
Hungarian expatriate footballers
Expatriate footballers in England
Hungarian expatriate sportspeople in England